Xiajiang County is a county of west-central Jiangxi province, People's Republic of China. It is under the jurisdiction of the prefecture-level city of Ji'an.

Administrative divisions
In the present, Xiajiang County has 6 towns , 4 townships and 1 Ethnic Township.
6 Towns

4 Townships

1 Ethnic Township
 Jinping Ethnic Township

Demographics 

Climate

Notes and references

External links
  Government site - 

 
County-level divisions of Jiangxi